Walter mac Thomas de Búrca (Walter Bourke), 3rd Mac William Íochtar (died 1440) was an Irish chieftain and noble who was lord of Lower (North) Connacht, Ireland.

Life
The son of Thomas mac Edmond Albanach de Búrca, 2nd Mac William Íochtar (d.1402), de Búrca was succeeded by his younger brothers, Edmund na Féasóige de Búrca (4th), Tomás Óg de Búrca (5th), and Risdeárd de Búrca (6th Mac William Íochtar), and later by his sons, Theobald Bourke (8th) and Ricard Bourke (9th Mac William Íochtar).

Annalistic references

From the Annals of the Four Masters:

 1402. Thomas, the son of Sir Edmond Albanagh Burke, i.e. Mac William, Lord of the English of Connaught, died, after the victory of penance. After the death of this Thomas Burke, two Mac Williams were made, namely, Ulick, the son of Richard Oge, who was elected the Mac William; and Walter, the son of Thomas, who was made another Mac William, but yielded submission to Mac William of Clanrickard for his seniority.
 M1410.8. Sabia, the daughter of Conor O'Brien, and wife of Walter Burke, died.
 M1412.10. A great army was led by Brian, son of Donnell, son of Murtough O'Conor of Sligo, about Lammas, first into Gaileanga, and thence into Clann-Cuain, Ceara, and Conmaicne Cuile Toladh, into which latter territory he brought the Clann-Maurice na-m-Brigh and their creaghts. The Clann-William Burke, the O'Flahertys, the O'Malleys, the Barretts, the inhabitants of the barony of Gaileanga, and the Costelloes, assembled to oppose them; but all these numerous as they were did not venture to give him either skirmish or battle, although Brian, in despite of them, burned their territories, destroyed their cornfields, and burned their fortresses, viz. Caislen-an-Bharraigh of Leth-inis, and Baile-Loch-Measca. He then left the Clann-Maurice, with their creaghts, in their own territory; and he obtained peace from the English and Irish on this expedition, and returned home in safety.
 M1422.12. The sons of Cormac Mac Donough, and the sons of Mulrony Mac Donough, ... had been banished from their country by their paternal uncle, Mac Donough, by Conor Mac Donough and his sons, and by Cormac Oge. For Mac Donough had erected a castle in the territory of the sons of Mulrony Mac Donough, that is, at Caiseal Locha-Deargain, and had entirely destroyed their crops and fields, and afterwards banished them to Mac William Burke;
 M1440.1. Mac William Burke, i.e. Walter, the son of Thomas, son of Sir Edmond Albanagh, Lord of the English of Connaught, and of many of the Irish, died of the plague a week before the Festival of the Holy Cross, in Autumn; and Edmond Burke, his brother, was styled Mac William in his place.

Genealogy

 Sir Edmond Albanach de Burgh (d. 1375),  1st Mac William Íochtar (Lower Mac William), (Mayo)
 William de Burgh (d.1368)
 Thomas mac Edmond Albanach de Burca, 1375–1402, 2nd Mac William Íochtar
 Walter mac Thomas de Burca (d.1440), 3rd Mac William Íochtar
 Theobald Bourke (d.1503), 8th Mac William Íochtar
 Meiler Bourke (d.1520), 11th Mac William Íochtar
 Ricard Bourke (d.1509), 9th Mac William Íochtar
 Seaán an Tearmainn Bourke (alive 1527), 13th Mac William Íochtar
 Ricard mac Seaán an Tearmainn Bourke (d.1571), 16th Mac William Íochtar
 Edmund na Féasóige de Burca, (d.1458), 4th Mac William Íochtar
 Ricard Ó Cuairsge Bourke (d.1473), 7th Mac William Íochtar
 Edmond de Burca (d.1527), 10th Mac William Íochtar
 Walter de Burca
 Seaán de Burca
 Oliver de Burca
 Seaán mac Oliver Bourke (d.1580), 17th Mac William Íochtar
 Richard Bourke (d.1586), 19th Mac William Íochtar
 Walter Ciotach de Burca of Belleek (d.1590)
 Tibbot (Theobald) MacWalter Kittagh Bourke, 21st Mac William Íochtar, 1st Marquess of Mayo
 Walter (Balthasar) Bourke, 2nd Marquess of Mayo
 Thomas Ruadh de Burca
 Uilleag de Burca
 Edmond de Burca (d.1527), 12th Mac William Íochtar
 David de Burca (alive 1537), 15th Mac William Íochtar
 Richard the Iron Bourke (d.1583), 18th Mac William Íochtar
 Tibbot (Theobald) ne Long Bourke (1567-1629), 23rd Mac William Íochtar, 1st Viscount Mayo (1627)
 Viscounts Mayo
 William "the Blind Abbot" Bourke (d.1593), 20th Mac William Íochtar
 Theobald mac Uilleag Bourke (d.1537), 14th Mac William Íochtar
 Risdeárd de Burca
 Ricard Deamhan an Chorráin de Burca
 Risdeárd Mac Deamhan an Chorráin (Richard) "the Devils Hook" Bourke (d.1601), 22nd Mac William Íochtar
 Seaán de Burca (d.1456)
 Tomás Óg de Burca, (d.1460), 5th Mac William Íochtar
 Risdeárd de Burca (d.1473), 6th Mac William Íochtar

References

Further reading
 The History of Mayo, Hubert T. Knox. 1908.
 Lower Mac William and Viscounts of Mayo, 1332-1649, in A New History of Ireland IX, pp. 235–36, Oxford, 1984 (reprinted 2002).

External links
 * http://www.ucc.ie/celt/published/T100005D/

People from County Mayo
15th-century Irish people
1440 deaths
Walter Mac Thomas De
Year of birth unknown